Geina buscki is a moth of the family Pterophoridae. It known from the United States, including Tennessee and Mississippi.

The wingspan is about 15 mm.

External links
Images
Bug Guide

Oxyptilini
Moths described in 1933
Taxa named by James Halliday McDunnough